Dündar is a Turkish given name for males. People named Dündar include:

 Dündar Aliosman, heir of Bayezid Osman and future 45th Head of the Imperial House of Osman
 Dündar Kılıç (1935–1999), infamous mob boss and legendary figure in the Turkish underworld
 Dündar Taşer (1925–1972), leading figure in Turkish nationalism
 Dündar Gazi (1210-1298), uncle of Osman I.
 Dündar Bey (death 1324) an Anatolian bey in post Seljuk era 
 Can Dündar (1961-), Turkish journalist

Turkish masculine given names